Jonathan Alonzo Esparza (born July 9, 1999) is an American soccer player who plays as a defender.

Club career
In 2018, he joined Liga MX club Tijuana. He was loaned to Ascenso MX club Oaxaca for the 2018-19 season. He made his debut in a Copa MX match on July 24 against Monarcas Morelia. He made his league debut on August 25 against Cafetaleros de Chiapas. In 2019, he was loaned to Celaya FC also in the Ascenso MX.

In 2020, he joined Mexican third division side Irapuato.

On January 21, 2021, he returned to the United States, signing with the Chattanooga Red Wolves of USL League One.

Exactly one year later, on January 21, 2022, he signed with Canadian Premier League club Valour FC.

International career
He represented the United States U18 at the 2017 Slovakia Cup.

Career statistics

Club

Notes

References

1999 births
Living people
American soccer players
United States men's youth international soccer players
American expatriate soccer players
Association football forwards
Club Tijuana footballers
Alebrijes de Oaxaca players
Ascenso MX players
American expatriate sportspeople in Mexico
Expatriate footballers in Mexico
Chattanooga Red Wolves SC players
Soccer players from California
Sportspeople from Chula Vista, California
American expatriate sportspeople in Canada
Expatriate soccer players in Canada
Valour FC players